Lamium album, commonly called white nettle or white dead-nettle, is a flowering plant in the family Lamiaceae. It is native throughout Europe and Asia, growing in a variety of habitats from open grassland to woodland, generally on moist, fertile soils.

Description

The flowers are visited by many types of insects, but mostly by long-tongued insects, like bees.

Distribution
L. album  is native to Eurasia, from Ireland in the West to Japan in the East. It occurs as two subspecies, subsp. album in the western range and subsp. barbatum in the far east of mainland Asia and in Japan.  It is common in England, rare in the west, and in north Scotland and introduced in eastern Ireland.

L. album  was introduced to North America, where it is widely naturalized.

Cultivation and uses 
The young leaves are edible, and can be used in salads or cooked as a vegetable.

Bees, especially bumble bees are attracted to the flowers which are a good source of early nectar and pollen, hence the plant is sometimes called the bee nettle.

Habitat
In the British Isles L. album  is found on roadsides, around hedges, and in waste-places.

Chemistry 
Two phenylpropanoid glycosides, lamalboside (2R-galactosylacteoside) and acteoside, the flavonol p-coumaroylglucoside, tiliroside, 5-caffeoylquinic acid (chlorogenic acid), along with rutoside and quercetin and kaempferol 3-O-glucosides can be isolated from the flowers of L. album. The plant also contains the iridoid glycosides lamalbid, alboside A and B, and caryoptoside as well as the hemiterpene glucoside hemialboside.

L.album was a favorite source of chlorophyll and other plant pigments for Mikhail Tsvet, the inventor of adsorption chromatography.

In folklore

A distillation of the flowers is reputed "to make the heart merry, to make a good colour in the face, and to make the vital spirits more fresh and lively."

Notes

External links 

 Flora Europaea: Lamium album
 Plants for a Future: Lamium album

album
Flora of Europe
Flora of Asia
Plants described in 1753
Taxa named by Carl Linnaeus